Robert Bristow (December 1662 – 27 August 1706) was an English politician. He was a Member of Parliament (MP) for Winchelsea from 23 July 1698 to November 1701.

He died aged 43.  His sons Robert (1688–1737) was also MP for Winchelsea, and a younger son John (1701–1768) was also an MP.

References

1662 births
1706 deaths
Place of birth missing
People from Winchelsea
English MPs 1698–1700
English MPs 1701